Starý Bohumín, lit. "Old Bohumín" is a part of the town of Bohumín in Karviná District, Moravian-Silesian Region, Czech Republic. It has a population of 1,344 (2022).

History 
The settlement was first mentioned in a written document in 1256 as Bogun and is the oldest part of today's town of Bohumín. Starý Bohumín lies on the Oder River, which forms a border with Poland. Before the construction of the Bohumín-Košice railway line, local inhabitants opposed train station to be built in their town. The construction was moved a few kilometres southeastward, and Starý Bohumín gradually lost its importance.

After World War I, fall of Austria-Hungary, Polish–Czechoslovak War and the division of Cieszyn Silesia in 1920, the town became a part of Czechoslovakia. Following the Munich Agreement, in October 1938 together with the Zaolzie region it was annexed by Poland, administratively organised in Frysztat County of Silesian Voivodeship. The town was then annexed by Nazi Germany at the beginning of World War II. After the war it was restored to Czechoslovakia.

See also 
 Polish minority in the Czech Republic
 Zaolzie

Footnotes

References 
 Description of the municipal part
 

Cities and towns in the Czech Republic
Neighbourhoods in the Czech Republic
Populated places in Karviná District
Cieszyn Silesia